The Inspiron (formerly stylized as inspiron) is a line of consumer-oriented laptop computers, desktop computers and all-in-one computers sold by Dell. The Inspiron range mainly competes against computers such as Acer's Aspire, Asus' Transformer Book Flip, VivoBook and Zenbook, HP's Pavilion, Stream and ENVY, Lenovo's IdeaPad, Samsung's Sens and Toshiba's Satellite.

Types 

The Dell Inspiron lineup consists of laptops, desktops and all in ones.

Dell Inspiron laptop computers
Dell Inspiron desktop computers
Dell Inspiron All-in-One
Discontinued:
Dell Inspiron Mini Series netbooks (2008-2010)

See also

Dell's Home Office/Consumer class product lines:
 Studio (mainstream desktop and laptop computers)
 XPS (high-end desktop and notebook computers)
 Studio XPS (high-end design-focus of XPS systems and extreme multimedia capability)
 Alienware (high-performance gaming systems)
 Adamo (high-end luxury subnotebook)

Dell Business/Corporate class product lines:
 Vostro (office/small business desktop and notebook systems)
 n Series (desktop and notebook computers shipped with Linux or FreeDOS installed)
 Latitude (business-focused notebooks)
 Optiplex (business-focused workstations)
 Precision (high performance workstations)

References

External links
 
Dell Inspiron Drivers

Dell laptops
Dell personal computers
2-in-1 PCs
Consumer electronics brands
Computer-related introductions in 1990